John Skelton Williams (July 6, 1865 – November 4, 1926) was a United States Comptroller of the Currency from 1914 to 1921 and the first president of the Seaboard Air Line Railway.

Biography
John Skelton Williams  was a leading southern financier. He served as the Comptroller of the Currency under President Woodrow Wilson from 1914 to 1921 after serving as Assistant Secretary of the Treasury. Previously, he had organized the Seaboard Air Line Railway into a single company, and served as its president from 1900 to 1903.

Williams was Comptroller throughout World War I. Under his leadership, the agency worked closely with the War Finance Corporation, which was established in 1918 to provide credit to businesses, including banks, to promote the war effort. During William's term, legislation was passed allowing the consolidation of two or more banks. A segregationist, he imposed segregation on the Bureau of Engraving and Printing and ended promotions for black workers.

References

Further reading
 John Moody and George Kibbe Turner (1911). "The Masters of Capital in America," McClure's Magazine, Vol. XXXVI, No. 3.
 Garet Garrett (1920). "The Whirling Pyramid," The New Republic, November 3.

External links

 Nomination of John Skelton Williams. Hearing before the Committee on Banking and Currency
 The Soul in the Dollar
 Biographical/Historical Information, John Skelton Williams Papers, University of Virginia Library

1865 births
1926 deaths
United States Comptrollers of the Currency
Comptrollers in the United States
Woodrow Wilson administration personnel